Opostomias is a genus of barbeled dragonfish.

Species
There are currently two recognized species in this genus:
 Opostomias micripnus (Günther, 1878) (Obese dragonfish)
 Opostomias mitsuii S. Imai, 1941 (Pitgum lanternfish)

References

Stomiidae
Marine fish genera
Taxa named by Albert Günther
Ray-finned fish genera